Ian David Twinn  (born 26 April 1950) is a British Conservative politician. He was educated at Cambridge Grammar School for Boys (now Netherhall School), the University of Wales and Reading University; he then worked as a lecturer. Twinn was elected as MP for Edmonton, becoming the seat's first Conservative MP in 48 years, and serving from 1983 until he lost his seat to Labour's Andy Love in 1997. Twinn was also Deputy Chairman of the Conservative Party from 1986 to 1988. He also became the first Conservative in Edmonton to be re-elected for a second term (in 1987) and a third (in 1992). He was appointed a CBE in 2018 for political and voluntary service.

In 1999, he was placed fifth on the Conservative Party list for London in the European Parliament elections. The Conservatives secured only four seats, but Twinn served briefly as an MEP from 21 October 2003 until the 2004 elections, following the resignation of Lord Bethell due to ill health. Twinn was sixth on the Conservative list at the subsequent EU election, and lost his seat as the Conservatives won only three. He was listed eighth in 2009, and again was unsuccessful in being elected.

References

External links 

1950 births
Living people
Conservative Party (UK) MPs for English constituencies
UK MPs 1983–1987
UK MPs 1987–1992
UK MPs 1992–1997
Conservative Party (UK) MEPs
MEPs for England 1999–2004
Alumni of the University of Wales
Alumni of the University of Reading